Anime and manga are forms of mass media produced by the content industry of Japan. The anime and manga industry forms an integral part of Japan's soft power as one of its most prominent cultural exports.  Anime is a Japanese cartoon with a specific style of animation. Anime storylines can include fantasy or real life. They are famous for elements like vivid graphics and character expressions. In contrast, manga is strictly paper drawings, with comic book style drawings. Usually, animes are adaptations of manga but not the other way around.

Subculture 

In Japanese, the word  does not have the same connotation of oppositional culture as it does in English, so it is frequently used in situations where "fandom" might be preferred by Westerners instead.

However, for overseas fans their first encounter with the subculture is typically through broadcast anime. It is common for a work to be distributed overseas via fansubs and scanlations, or unauthorized fanmade translations of anime and manga, respectively, before official translations become available. Typically, overseas fans will first translate the work into English, French, and Chinese, and then into other languages using those as an intermediary. The legality of ethics of these fanmade translations has been hotly debated. Many of those involved refuse to profit from their translations out of principle, and destroy the copies once officially licensed versions become available. Some industry participants in both Japan and the United States have expressed tacit acceptance of fanmade translations, seeing them as a trial run for the American market.

Other types of media such as light novels and video games are frequently associated with and considered part of the anime and manga subculture.

History 
The explosive growth in Japan's soft power began in the 1970s, when it changed from a net importer to a net exporter of information. Prior to the late 1990s, the primary export of Japan's content industry was video games. The value of the anime and manga industry is estimated at US$5 billion as of 2008.

Anime and manga were not widely marketed in the United States before the mid-1990s, with only a few titles available on network television. The rapid growth of the genre in the United States has led some commentators to deem it an American import rather than a Japanese export. Due to anime and manga's increased popularity overseas, various companies have begun catering to foreign audiences such as Kadokawa Corporation which has adopted the "Overseas first" policy.

Industry growth 
Precedence Research, a research company for market insights, projects that the anime market will increase from $24.5 billion to $47.14 billion by 2028.

In other languages 
In China, dongman is a portmanteau of donghua and manhua, used as an umbrella term for animation and comics. The term "dongman" is often mistakenly used to exclusively refer to the animation, while in fact it should include both the donghua and the manhua. When video games are included, the term used is ACG, short for "animation, comics, and games". A further extension which includes light novels is ACGN, or "animation, comics, games, and novels". Another term for the genre as a whole is erciyuan, meaning "two-dimensional space". One of the most popular websites for ACGN content is bilibili.

See also 
 Glossary of anime and manga
 Anime
 Manga
 Cool Japan
 J-pop
 Manhwa (Korea)
 Manhua (China)
 Anime and manga fandom

References